The Duployan shorthand, or Duployan stenography, was created by Father Émile Duployé in 1860 for writing French. Since then, it has been expanded and adapted for writing English, German, Spanish, Romanian, Latin, Danish, and Chinook Jargon. The Duployan stenography is classified as a geometric, alphabetic stenography and is written left-to-right in connected stenographic style. The Duployan shorthands, including Chinook writing, Pernin's Universal Phonography, Perrault's English Shorthand, the Sloan-Duployan Modern Shorthand, and Romanian stenography, were included as a single script in version 7.0 of the Unicode Standard / ISO 10646

Typology and structure 

Duployan is classified as a geometric stenography, in that the prototype for letterforms are based on lines and circles, instead of ellipses. It is alphabetic, with both consonant and vowel signs in equal prominence. Writing is in a left-to-right direction, proceeding down the page, as in common European writing. Most Duployan letters will attach to adjacent letters, allowing a word (or words) to be written in a single stroke, without lifting the pen.

Consonants 

Consonant characters come in two basic styles: line consonants and arc consonants. All consonants have a shape, size, and stroke direction that do not change based on the surrounding characters. Both types of consonants are contrasted by orientation, length, and the presence of ancillary dots and dashes on or near the letter.

The line consonants come in five orientations: vertical, horizontal, left-to-right falling, left-to-right rising, and right-to-left falling; and in three lengths: short, long, and extended. Variations of some line consonants will have dots adjacent to the center of the line.

Arc consonants come in two arc lengths: half circle, and quarter circle. The half circle arcs have four orientations: left, right, top, and bottom half; and two lengths: regular and extended. Variations of the half circle arc consonants have dots inside and outside of the bowl, and dashes across the middle. The quarter arc consonants also have four orientations corresponding to the four quadrants of a circle, with both upwards and downwards strokes, and come in regular and extended lengths. The only variant quarter arc consonant is the addition of a dot (Duployan letter H) to the Duployan letter W to make the Duployan letter Wh.

Vowels 

Vowels characters also come in two basic styles: circle vowels, and orienting vowels. Vowels have only a general shape and size, but their orientation and exact appearance are usually dictated by the adjacent characters.

Circle vowels are written by creating a loop that starts from the preceding character acting as a tangent, continuing around the circle until reaching the tangent point of the following character, at which point the following letterform is written, with the two adjacent characters crossing to complete the "circle". Variants of the circle vowels have dots in the middle of the circle, or a protuberance in from the circle. Circle vowels may also take standard diacritic marks when used to write some languages.

Orienting vowels are written by rotating the vowel to match the incoming angle of the preceding character, then mirrored along the axis of that character to avoid the following character crossing. They come in two varieties, defined by whether they will tend toward the right or left if the adjacent characters will allow either. Nasal vowels are considered a special case of an orienting vowel, and will act as orienting vowels, except in the Chinook script, where nasals can appear as diacritics.

Affixes and word signs 
Many Duployan shorthands use small unattached marks, as well as various crossing and touching strokes, as markers for common prefixes and suffixes. Individual letters and letterlike symbols are also used in many Duployan shorthands to stand for common words and phrases. Overlapping two or more letters and signs can be used in some shorthands as word signs and abbreviations.

Ligatures 
Most Duployan scripts do not make use of true ligatures that are not just one of its constituent letters with a distinguishing mark. The Romanian stenography is fairly unusual in having a number of vowel ligatures, especially with the Romanian U.

Connecting letters 

Most Duployan letters cursively connect to any adjacent letters. Circle vowels will sometimes reduce to as small as a semi-circle in order to accommodate the incoming and outgoing strokes of adjacent letters, and orienting vowels will rotate to meet the preceding letter at a straight angle, while mirroring to present themselves to the following letter.

Alphabetical order 

Duployan does not have a widely agreed alphabetical order. A precursory order for the alphabet has been invented for the Unicode script proposal, however; and this order can basically be found in the order of the Unicode allocation (see Table of characters). This order places consonants before vowels, with similar type and size letters grouped roughly together.

Table of characters 

This table lists the characters used in all of the Duployan shorthands along with their Unicode code points. A basic alphabetization can be derived from the order of the letters. Letters with a name otherwise identical to a more universal letter will have a parenthetical denoting its shorthand of use: (Per) for Pernin's Universal Phonography, (Rom) for Romanian stenography, and (Sl) for Sloan-Duployan shorthand.

Spacing and line consonants

Arc consonants

Vowels

Affixes, marks, punctuation, and others

French Duployan 
The use of French Duployan shorthand has historically been heavier in areas of southern France and Switzerland, with the Prévost-Delaunay and Aimé-Paris shorthands more common in northern France and the Paris area.

French Duployan makes use of an extensive list of letter words, combined consonants, and affix marks, but does not cross letters to make abbreviations. Like most European shorthands, French Duployan omits vowels that can be guessed by a fluent speaker.

Chinook writing 

The Chinook writing, or Wawa shorthand, or Chinuk pipa, was developed by Father Jean-Marie-Raphaël Le Jeune in the early 1890s for writing in Chinook Jargon, Lillooet, Thompson, Okanagan, Latin, and English, with the intended purpose of bringing literacy and church teaching to the first nations in the Catholic Diocese of Kamloops. The result was three decades' publication of the Chinook Jargon language Kamloops Wawa.

The Chinook writing is notable by the absence of affixes and word signs, the phonological rigor – vowels were not omitted, even when predictable – and its use of W-vowels. Chinook writing is also notable in splitting a word into nominally syllabic units as well as using  the only non-joining consonant characters in Duployan.

Romanian stenography 
The Romanian stenography was developed by Margaretta Sfințescu in the 1980s. Like French Duployan, Romanian stenography uses a large number of affix marks and word signs.

English shorthands 
Several adaptations of Duployan were developed for writing English, including those by Helen Pernin, J. Matthew Sloan, Denis Perrault, Carl Brandt, and George Galloway. The Pernin, Perrault, and Sloan shorthands are distinguished from other Duployan shorthands by the presence of the quarter-arc compound consonants. They also make use of affix marks, and omit redundant vowels. Galloway and Brandt shorthands are not included in the Duployan Unicode proposal.

Unlike other Duployan shorthands, Sloan-Duployan uses a thick, or heavy, stroke to indicate the addition of an "R" sound to a letter. Although not found in the other Duployan shorthands, contrastive thick and thin strokes are common in other shorthands, such as Pitman shorthand, where a heavy stroke would indicate a voiced consonant, and thin the unvoiced version of the same consonant.

Unicode 

Duployan shorthand was added to the Unicode Standard in June 2014 with the release of version 7.0.

References 

 
Shorthand systems
Alphabets
1868 introductions